Jenny Bhatt is an Indian American writer, literary translator, and literary critic. She is the author of an award-winning story collection, Each of Us Killers, an award-shortlisted literary translation, Ratno Dholi: The Best Stories of Dhumketu, and the literary translation, The Shehnai Virtuoso and Other Stories by Dhumketu. She is the founder of Desi Books, a global multimedia platform for South Asian literature, and a creative writing instructor at Writing Workshops Dallas.

Personal life 
Bhatt was born in Rajkot, Gujarat, India, and grew up in Mumbai. She did most of her high school at Kimmins High School in Panchgani, Maharashtra. She attended the University of Hertfordshire in England as an engineering undergraduate. Thereafter, she worked in Germany, England, Scotland, and the United States at various multi-national corporations until 2012.

From 2012 to 2014, she worked as a personal financial advisor to people running small businesses.

In 2020, she founded Desi Books LLC, a global multimedia forum that showcases South Asian literature and connects readers and writers through conversation and community.

She's based in the Dallas, Texas area.

Writing (fiction and nonfiction) 
From 2016 onward, Bhatt's short fiction has been published in various literary journals. Her non-fiction and literary criticism have been published in various venues like NPR, The Washington Post, Literary Hub, The Atlantic, Publishers Weekly, and others.

In 2022 Bhatt guest-edited a collection of Gujarati literature in translation works at Words Without Borders.

Bhatt's weekly newsletter, 'We Are All Translators' has received mentions at venues like Literary Hub and The Dallas Morning News.

Each of Us Killers (short story collection) 
A winner in the Foreword INDIES 2020 Book of the Year Short Stories award category and a finalist in the Multicultural Adult Fiction category, Bhatt's debut short story collection was cited as one of the most anticipated debuts of the second half of 2020 by Electric Literature, Literary Hub, The Millions, and Entropy Magazine.

Published by 7.13 Books, the story collection received a starred review from Shelf Awareness, with praise that “[c]hallenging assumptions, confronting power, manipulating barriers whenever possible–even at grave personal cost–Bhatt’s cast surprises, inspires, frightens, beguiles, but never disappoints.” Publishers Weekly wrote that Bhatt's "stories are memorable on their own, and they add up to a powerful expression of the hunger for success on one's own terms." Kirkus Reviews called it a "formally diverse collection with exquisitely crafted stories about longing, striving, and learning what we can control" and listed it as one of the must-read collections of Fall 2020. Debutiful, Ms. Magazine. Bustle listed it as a must-read book of September 2020 and as one of the best collections of 2020. Largehearted Boy listed it as a favorite short story collection of 2020. Book Riot listed it as one of the top ten short story collections of 2020 by Asian authors. Other venues that gave positive or rave reviews: The Dallas Morning News; Texas Public Radio; Open the Magazine; The National Book Review; New York Journal of Books; NRI Pulse; India Currents; Puerto del Sol; National Book Critics' Circle; Phoebe Journal; Vagabond City; Platform Magazine; and The Hindu Business Line.. Tabish Khair, writing for The Hindu, described the work thus: ". . . Bhatt gets under the skin of her characters with an ease that is difficult to achieve when creating characters beyond the pale of capital and caste. [. . .] using lively, sculpted language that avoids the stilted, literary English often afflicting Indian English writing."

Anthologies 
Bhatt's story 'Return to India' was included in The Best American Mystery and Suspense 2021, selected by Alafair Burke and series editor, Steph Cha. In her introduction, Burke wrote: "In “Return to India”, Jenny Bhatt uses the structure of witness statements to build a tightly woven mystery, while effortlessly balancing a broad cast of diverse characters and voices as they collectively narrate the painful series of facts leading to a crime of violence."

In 2023, the crime/noir forward anthology, The Dark Waves of Winter, edited by David M. Olsen, included a short story by Bhatt titled 'Lili's Song'. IndieReader called the anthology "a first-rate anthology for literary short story fans with consistently excellent writing throughout."

Literary Translation

Ratno Dholi: The Best Stories of Dhumketu (literary translation)  
Shortlisted for the Valley of Words Book Award in the 'English Translations From Regional Languages' category, this book is a translation of 26 short stories by the Gujarati writer, Dhumketu, published by HarperCollins India in October 2020. The Hindustan Times praised the translation as "reasonably fast-paced and eminently accessible." Womensweb.in  said that "Jenny Bhatt’s translation is nuanced but simple, and does justice to these stories.” Firstpost wrote that "Her translations make for a crisp and honest rendering of 20th century Gujarat . . ." The Hindu wrote: "The translator of this collection, Jenny Bhatt, contextualizes [Dhumketu's] work in the introduction while providing insightful details about his craft." The Indian Express described the translation as mellifluous and wrote that "well-informed choices for pivotal words open new possibilities of re-readings for a Gujarati reader." The Deccan Chronicle praised the depth of each story, adding: “. . . which means that a) the translator has done an excellent job and b) every story in the book is satisfying, something that does not often happen with short story collections.”

The Shehnai Virtuoso and Other Stories by Dhumketu (literary translation) 
In 2022, the US edition of Bhatt's literary translation of Dhumketu's selected short stories was published as The Shehnai Virtuoso and Other Stories by Deep Vellum Books. Kirkus Reviews called it "a love letter to the power of art and the human spirit." Publishers Weekly said that "Complex characters, vibrant imagery, and descriptions of rural Gujarat State bolster each of the stories." Words Without Borders reviewed it as a "skillful translation." Asymptote Journal described it as “. . . a kaleidoscope, abundant in variegating depictions of both landscapes and the human interiors populating them.” The translation also made World Literature Todays 75 Notable Translations of 2022 list.

In an interview with Five Books, Bhatt said that "Not only is it the first ever book-length translation of his vast oeuvre, it is also the first ever translation from Gujarati being published in the US, where we have the largest Gujarati diaspora."

Desi Books LLC 
Bhatt started Desi Books as a podcast in April 2020 to spotlight books by writers of South Asian origin. South Asia refers to the SAARC countries: India, Pakistan, Bangladesh, Sri Lanka, Afghanistan, Nepal, Bhutan, and The Maldives. Mid-Day called it a venue for "the best of desi reads." Eastern Eye described it as one of the most "popular podcasts redefining real talk." The Dallas Morning News featured Bhatt and Desi Books saying "This North Texas author is shining a light on Desi authors from around the globe." The Los Angeles Review of Books described it as follows: "What started as a modest program now has several channels, featuring conversations on craft, book reviews, and even video episodes."

In August 2021, Desi Books was registered as an LLC and a global multimedia forum that showcases South Asian literature and connects readers and writers through conversation and community.

In February 2023, Bhatt announced that she would be winding down the platform although the archives would remain online.

Teaching 
Bhatt teaches creative writing at Writing Workshops Dallas.

References 

American writers of Indian descent
21st-century American women writers
21st-century American short story writers
American literary critics
Women literary critics
Writers from Gujarat
21st-century Indian women writers
21st-century Indian writers
21st-century Indian short story writers
21st-century American writers
Women writers from Gujarat
Literary translators
Indian women translators
Gujarati–English translators
Alumni of the University of Hertfordshire
Living people
1972 births
Writers from Dallas
Writers from Texas
American people of Gujarati descent
American women writers of Indian descent
American women critics